Persea lingue is an evergreen tree or shrub in the laurel family (Lauraceae), found in Argentina and Chile. It belongs to the genus Persea, a group of evergreen trees including the avocado. P. lingue was historically used in leather production, and is currently threatened by habitat loss.

Distribution
Native to the Central Valley in Chile and adjacent parts of Argentina.

Use
In pharmacy its bark was once mentioned as cortex Lauri lingue, medicinal action unknown.

In the late 19th and early 20th century the bark of the tree which is rich in tannins was used to produce leather. An industry based in Valdivia and led by German immigrants and German-Chileans harvested the tree and exported the leather to Hamburg and Le Havre. A decline of wild stands Persea lingue and tariffs imposed by the German Empire in 1898 contributed in the decline of the leather industry of southern Chile.

Etymology
Persea see Persea.
Lingue from Lingue River in Chile, where it grows.

References

lingue
Flora of central Chile
Near threatened plants
Taxonomy articles created by Polbot